Ndjibu N'Golomingi (born 16 April 1964) is cyclist from the Democratic Republic of the Congo. He competed at the 1988 Summer Olympics and the 1992 Summer Olympics.

References

External links
 

1964 births
Living people
Democratic Republic of the Congo male cyclists
Olympic cyclists of the Democratic Republic of the Congo
Cyclists at the 1988 Summer Olympics
Cyclists at the 1992 Summer Olympics
Place of birth missing (living people)